The Leipzig school was a branch of sociology developed by a group of academics led by philosopher and sociologist Hans Freyer at the University of Leipzig, Germany in the 1930s.

Freyer saw Nazism as an opportunity; many of his followers were politically active Nazis. They included Arnold Gehlen, Gunter Ipsen, Heinz Maus, Karl Heinz Pfeffer, and Helmut Schelsky.

The National Socialist German Workers Party (Nazi Party) did not allow any competing ideologies to develop in universities; however, some of the Leipzig School group remained at the university until 1945. Their numbers declined as some emigrated (Günther) or made a career in the Third Reich (Gehlen, Ipsen, Pfeffer), and before the war ended, Freyer himself left to take up a teaching position at the University of Budapest.

In Indo-Germanic studies, the Leipzig School also refers to the researchers around Karl Brugmann and August Leskien in the last third of the 19th century, who were called Junggrammatists.

External links
Dr. Elfriede Üner, sociologist -- key areas of research: Leipzig School / Hans Freyer

Further reading
Peter Bernhard: The Leipzig School in Dessau. In: Olaf Thormann (Ed.): Bauhaus Saxony, Arnoldsche: Stuttgart 2019, ISBN 978-3-8979-553-5, p365–370.
Freyer/Gehlen/Schelsky (Die Leipziger Schule), article by Karl-Siegbert Rehberg, in Klassiker der Soziologie Bd.2, Beck´sche Reihe 1999. Published by Dirk Kaesler.
Soziologische Denktraditionen Karl-Siegbert Rehberg, 2001. 

Leipzig School
Leipzig University

References